Władysław Jan Żmuda (born 10 February 1939 in Ruda Śląska) is a Polish football player and coach.

Career

Playing career
Żmuda played for Slavia Ruda Śląska and Śląsk Wrocław.

Coaching career
Żmuda  managed Śląsk Wrocław, Górnik Zabrze, GKS Katowice, Widzew Łódź, Ruch Chorzów and Espérance de Tunis.

References

1939 births
Living people
Polish footballers
Śląsk Wrocław players
Polish football managers
Śląsk Wrocław managers
Górnik Zabrze managers
GKS Katowice managers
Widzew Łódź managers
Ruch Chorzów managers
Espérance Sportive de Tunis managers
Polonia Bytom managers
Sportspeople from Ruda Śląska
Association football midfielders